The Voice of Germany (season 4) is a German reality talent show that premiered on 9 October 2014 on ProSieben and Sat.1. Based on the reality singing competition The Voice of Holland, the series was created by Dutch television producer John de Mol. It is part of an international series. Only one judge from season 3, Samu Haber, singer of the Finnish pop-rock band Sunrise Avenue was retained for season 4. The other three judges of season 3, Nena, The BossHoss and Max Herre were replaced. Nena and The BossHoss had served for the program's all three previous seasons and Herre had been a new judge in season 3. They were replaced by the returning judge, the Irish singer-songwriter, guitarist Rea Garvey, a judge for seasons 1 and 2 coming back after a hiatus of a year. Stefanie Kloß lead singer of the band Silbermond resided for the first time in the series. So did the two collaborating judges sitting together, the German artists Michi Beck and Smudo both part of  German hip hop group Die Fantastischen Vier. On 12 December 2014, Charley Ann Schmutzler was announced the winner of the season, marking Michi & Smudo's first win as a coach and the second duo coach to win in the show's history. Also, Schmutzler became the first winning artist to have only received one chair turn in the blind auditions.

The first phase: The Blind Auditions

Episode 1: October 9, 2014

Episode 2: October 10, 2014

Episode 3: October 16, 2014

Episode 4: October 17, 2014

Episode 5: October 23, 2014

Episode 6: October 24, 2014

Episode 7: October 30, 2014

The second phase: The Battle Rounds 

For this first time, this series will see the Steal Deal where eliminated contestants can be stolen by other coaches.

 Key
  – Coach hit his/her "I WANT YOU" button
  – Artist defaulted to this coaches team
  – Artist elected to join this coaches team
  – Battle winner
  – Battle loser
  - Battle loser but was saved by another coach

Episode 8: October 31, 2014

Episode 9: November 6, 2014

Episode 10: November 6, 2014

Episode 10: November 13, 2014

The third phase: The Knockout Round

Two contestants sing an individual song and the coach decides which contestant will advance to the Live Shows.

Color key:

Episode 11: November 13, 2014

Episode 12: November 20, 2014

The fourth phase: The Live shows
The live shows started on 21 November 2014. All Live shows were broadcast on Sat.1. In the first two live shows the four remaining contestants of every team were split in groups of two. After all the contestants in each group had sung their individual songs, the responsible coach had to award 20, 30 & 50 points to these contestants. After this a televoting had been held, which made up 50% of voting. The contestant with the most points advanced to final.

In the Semifinal and Final the coach didn't vote and only the public decided who will advance and win The Voice of Germany 2014.

Episode 14: November 21, 2014

Episode 15: November 28, 2014

Episode 16 (Semifinal): December 5, 2014
The semifinal saw the introduction of "The Cross-Battles". Two contestant of different teams sing an individual song. The contestant with the most public votes advances to the final. After the announcement of the finalist, the winning contestant sang his winning song. All songs, also the ones which were not presented live, were released on iTunes. Every download counted as two phone calls from the public in the final voting.

Episode 17 (Final): December 12, 2014

External links
 Official website on ProSieben.de
 The Voice of Germany on fernsehserien.de

2014 German television seasons
4